Horace His de la Salle was a French art collector, mainly collecting drawings. He donated a large part of his collection to French museums, including 21 paintings and 450 drawings to the Louvre.

Collection 

The collection included drawings by a lot of masters going from Nicolas Poussin, Théodore Géricault, or Pierre-Paul Prud'hon to Fra Angelico, Maurice Quentin de la Tour, or Lucas van Leyden.

References

1795 births
1878 deaths
French art collectors